Hydrobia acuta is a species of very small (4-6mm.) brackish water snail with a gill and an operculum,  an aquatic gastropod mollusk in the family Hydrobiidae.

Description
Draparnaud's description reads "Coquille ovale-oblongue, un peu conique, aiguë à son sommet,transparente, lisse, quoique marquée de légères stries lorsqu'on l'observe à la loupe. Dans son naturel elle une couleur verdàtre.La spire a six à sept tours. L'ouverture est ovale et le péristome simple.Fente ombilicale peu prononcée. Opercule mince et lisse.
In English "Shell oval-oblong, slightly conical, acute at the top transparent, smooth, albeit marked with light streaks when it is observed under the microscope. In nature it is a greenish colour.The spire has six or seven whorls. The opening is oval and the peristome is simple.Little pronounced umbilical slot.Operculum thin and smooth.

Subspecies 
 Hydrobia acuta neglecta Muus, 1963

Distribution
This species occurs on the coasts of the Mediterranean Sea and Black Sea and, as a rare species in Ireland.

References

 AnimalBase info at:

External  links
Habitas
 Images at: 
  Images at: Encyclopedia of Life  

Hydrobiidae
Hydrobia
Gastropods described in 1805